Acantholimon ekatherinae is a species of Plumbaginaceae in the genus Acantholimon. It native to Kazakhstan and Uzbekistan in central Asia.

Reference 

ekatherinae

Flora of Central Asia